Annapolis is an unincorporated community in Salem Township, Jefferson County, in the U.S. state of Ohio.

History
Annapolis was originally called New Salem, and under the latter name was platted in 1802. A post office called New Salem was established in 1815, the name was changed to Annapolis 1823, and the post office closed in 1914. Besides the post office, Annapolis had a country store.

References

Unincorporated communities in Jefferson County, Ohio
Unincorporated communities in Ohio